Picornain 2A (picornavirus endopeptidase 2A, poliovirus protease 2A, rhinovirus protease 2A, 2A protease, 2A proteinase, protease 2A, proteinase 2Apro, picornaviral 2A proteinase, Y-G proteinase 2A, poliovirus proteinase 2A, poliovirus protease 2Apro) is a protease enzyme. This enzyme catalyses the following chemical reaction:

 Selective cleavage of Tyr-Gly bond in picornavirus polyprotein

This enzyme is coded by entero-, rhino-, aphto- and cardioviruses.

References

External links 
 

EC 3.4.22
Picornaviridae